

The Zaldo de Nebot Residence, also known as the Fornaris Residence, is a historic house in Ponce, Puerto Rico. Built to a Neoclassical design in 1895, it is one of the fullest expressions of 19th century architecture for Ponce's wealthy creole class. Notable are the trompe-l'œil interior wall paintings of Parisian landmarks and fin de siècle decorative detailing.

The house was entered on the National Register of Historic Places in 1988.

Notes

See also
National Register of Historic Places listings in Ponce, Puerto Rico

References

External links

Summary sheet from the Puerto Rico State Historic Preservation Office 

Houses on the National Register of Historic Places in Puerto Rico
Houses completed in 1895
1895 establishments in Puerto Rico
Neoclassical architecture in Puerto Rico
National Register of Historic Places in Ponce, Puerto Rico